Tirur State assembly constituency is one of the 140 state legislative assembly constituencies in Kerala state in southern India. It is also one of the seven state legislative assembly constituencies included in the Ponnani Lok Sabha constituency. As of the 2021 assembly elections, the current MLA is Kurukkoli Moideen of IUML.

Local self governed segments

Tirur Niyamasabha constituency is composed of the following local self governed segments:

{ "type": "ExternalData",  "service": "geoshape",  "ids": "Q6354338,Q13114609,Q13110215,Q16137234,Q13112532,Q13112400,Q16137665"}

Members of Legislative Assembly
The following list contains all members of Kerala legislative assembly who have represented Tirur Niyamasabha Constituency during the period of various assemblies:

Key

Election results
Percentage change (±%) denotes the change in the number of votes from the immediate previous election.

2021 Assembly Election

Niyamasabha Election 2016
There were 2,05,287 registered voters in Tirur Constituency for the 2016 Kerala Niyamasabha Election.

Partywise Results

Local Self Governed segment wise Results 2016 
The Local Self Governed segment wise result of 2016 Niyamasabha election is as follows:

Niyama Sabha Election 2011
There were 1,66,314 registered voters in Tirur Constituency for the 2011 Kerala Niyamasabha Election.

1952

See also
 Tirur Municipality
 Malappuram district
 List of constituencies of the Kerala Legislative Assembly
 2016 Kerala Legislative Assembly election

References 

Assembly constituencies of Kerala

State assembly constituencies in Malappuram district